Adriana Victor Lessa (born 1 February 1971) is a Brazilian actress, singer, television presenter, and dancer.

Career 

Before beginning her work as an actress in 1986 with the stage director Antunes Filho, Adriana was an athlete and volleyball team participated in the Sport Club Corinthians Paulista and the track team in the city of Guarulhos.

TV Fama presented the program along with Nelson Rubens and Íris Stefanelli in RedeTV! 2006 to 2010. During this season of performances on TV and / or theater after O Clone Adriana reinvented – and created her own web site facilitating their contact with the audience.

Participated as a guest singer, the musical groups of varying styles (RAP, Caribbean rhythms, forro foot of the mountain and MPB) and performed with her band in Angola. Participated, along with Paul Brown and Black Primo, as host of "Meet Rap" performed Anhangabaú Valley in 1994.

In 2002, as a singer, made a cameo appearance with the band Hillsong, at Via Funchal in São Paulo, singing a duet with one of the vocalists. By 2003, the actress was a member of Igreja Renascer em Cristo.

She was the only Brazilian to participate in the musical Folies Bergère in Las Vegas at the invitation of the program Amaury Jr.

In 2010 she signed with the SBT to act in the novel Corações Feridos. In 2012 returned to acting in the Globo, with the program Na Moral, where he made a docudrama.

Work on TV 
 As an actress

 Presenter

Theater

Film

References

External links 

1971 births
Living people
People from Guarulhos
Brazilian television actresses
Brazilian telenovela actresses
Brazilian film actresses
Brazilian radio personalities
Brazilian stage actresses